Amphonyx duponchel, or Duponchel's sphinx, is a moth of the family Sphingidae. The species was first described by Felipe Poey in 1832.

Distribution  
It is found in tropical and subtropical lowlands in Cuba and the West Indies and from Bolivia, southern Brazil and Argentina to Venezuela, Belize, Guatemala, Nicaragua, Costa Rica and Mexico. It is also found in Florida and Texas, where it is rare.

Description 
The wingspan is 110–150 mm, with the males being much smaller than the females. There are black discal dashes and a transverse, kidney-shaped, dirty white discal spot located on the forewing upperside.

biology 
Adults are on wing year round. They feed on nectar at flowers.

The larvae feed on Guatteria diospyroides, Annona purpurea, Annona reticulata, Xylopia frutescens and Annona glabra and probably other Annonaceae species. They are very colourful.

References

External links
"Duponchel's sphinx (Cocytius duponchel)" Moths of North America. Retrieved December 31, 2018.

Amphonyx
Moths of North America
Moths of South America
Moths described in 1832
Taxa named by Felipe Poey